The 2019 Hungarian Grand Prix (formally known as the Formula 1 Rolex Magyar Nagydíj 2019) was a Formula One motor race which was held on 4 August 2019 at the Hungaroring in Mogyoród, Hungary.

Background

Entrants

The drivers and teams entered were the same as those on the season entry list with no additional stand-in drivers for either the race or practice.

Championship standings before the race 
Heading into the weekend it was Lewis Hamilton and Mercedes who held a lead of 41 and 148 points in the drivers and constructors championships respectively. The size of their leads meant that both would still be leading their respective championships after the race regardless of the race result.

Qualifying 

Max Verstappen was fastest, becoming the first Dutch Formula 1 driver to be on pole and also the 100th different driver to be on pole in Formula 1 history. He was followed by Mercedes' drivers Valtteri Bottas and Lewis Hamilton.

Qualifying classification 

Notes
  – Antonio Giovinazzi received a three-place grid penalty for impeding Lance Stroll during qualifying.
  – Daniel Ricciardo was required to start from the back of the grid for exceeding his quota for power unit components.

Race

Race report 
Max Verstappen got a reasonable start from pole position but the Mercedes cars of Valtteri Bottas and Lewis Hamilton were both able to attack into turn one, forcing Verstappen to defend on the inside. However, Bottas locked his front right tyre forcing Hamilton to take a wider line through the corner and allowing Verstappen to pull away between turns one and two. Behind the front three cars, Charles Leclerc got a good start and maintained his lead over teammate Sebastian Vettel into turn one but Carlos Sainz managed to get ahead of both Pierre Gasly and Lando Norris to briefly threaten Vettel on the entry to the second corner.

Through turn two, Bottas once again locked his tyres allowing Hamilton to attack around the outside and eventually pass through turn three, albeit with a tap on Bottas's front wing on the exit. The overtaking move forced Bottas slightly wide and onto the kerbs which slowed him enough for Leclerc to challenge on the run up to turn four. As Leclerc passed Bottas, he drifted to the left hitting the same part of the wing that Hamilton had touched moments before, damaging it. The incident was investigated by the stewards but no action was taken.

The damage to his wing hindered Bottas's pace and Vettel was able to overtake on the start finish straight at the start of lap 2. Bottas stayed out for a few more laps but was eventually brought into the pits at the end of lap 6 for a change to the hard tyres and a new front wing, dropping him to last place. At the front, Verstappen and Hamilton began to pull away from the rest of the field. By lap 13 the gap between Hamilton, in second place, and Leclerc, in third, was more than 10 seconds. Whilst the two Ferraris of Leclerc and Vettel were running within a few seconds of each other in third and fourth with the rest of the field lagging a further 17 seconds behind.

By lap 15 Bottas had managed to start making progress through the field and was up to seventeenth place. Just ahead of him Daniel Ricciardo had captured fourteenth place and Sergio Pérez was running in eleventh from his starting position of sixteenth. At the start of lap 19, the two Toro Rosso cars of Daniil Kvyat and Alexander Albon battled side by side all the way through the first sector, running millimetres apart at the exit of turn two, before Kvyat forced Albon onto the run off area after turn four and took twelfth place.

At the front, Verstappen pitted at the end of lap 25 for hard tyres, giving Hamilton a temporary lead. Hamilton then tried to push to overcut Verstappen on pit stop strategy but failed to make ground and was pitted on lap 32 for hard tyres, emerging about 5 seconds behind Verstappen. Immediately Hamilton went on the attack, however the two leading cars had to pick their way through traffic as they lapped slower cars. Whilst this slowed both drivers' progress, the presence of the lapped cars also gave Verstappen DRS allowing him to stay ahead of Hamilton. At the end of lap 38, Verstappen was held up by Ricciardo and then made a small mistake on the exit of turn twelve allowing Hamilton to close to 0.3 seconds. Both had DRS as they started lap 39 but Hamilton managed to pull almost alongside into turn one as they lapped Ricciardo. Unable to make the move, Hamilton continued to fight through turns two and three before launching a brave sortie into turn four that saw him run wide and fall back behind Verstappen.

Throughout the race, Hamilton had been struggling with brake issues, and the prolonged assault on Verstappen had overheated his brakes, forcing the Mercedes to back off through the next few laps. Knowing that they had used the best of the current set of tyres, Mercedes opted to try a two-stop strategy and pitted Hamilton for medium tyres on at the end of lap 48. By now, the gap between second and third place was almost 40 seconds so, with an expected 20 seconds lost due to a pit stop, Hamilton could pit without dropping any positions. Red Bull chose not to respond, fearing that Verstappen would lose position to Hamilton via the undercut.

Both Verstappen and Hamilton had to fight through traffic but, despite some initial gains, Hamilton was 15 seconds behind with 14 laps remaining. On lap 60, Hamilton was 12 seconds behind but then began to reel in Verstappen. On lap 63, Verstappen reported over the team radio that his tyres were "dead" with the gap to Hamilton less than 6 seconds. By the end of lap 66, Hamilton had caught up to Verstappen, easily passed him round the outside through turn one, and pulled away; he maintained the lead to the end of the race. Behind the leaders, the Ferraris of Leclerc and Vettel battled over third place. Ferrari had put their drivers on a split strategy and pitted Vettel a second time for soft tyres which allowed him to pass Leclerc, who was on old hard tyres, at the start of lap 68. Having lost the race lead, Verstappen pitted for soft tyres and proceeded to set the fastest lap of the race, a 1:17.103 which was a new lap record at the time, and thus earned him an extra championship point.

Further down the field, Carlos Sainz came in fifth and Lando Norris managed ninth earning twelve points for McLaren. Kimi Räikkönen came in seventh for Alfa Romeo and Albon secured the last point scoring position of tenth for Toro Rosso. Romain Grosjean was the only retirement, on lap 51 due to a water pressure issue.

Bottas managed to recover to eighth place and Gasly finished sixth but both were scrutinised in the media due to their poor races in comparison to their teammates. Regarding Gasly, Red Bull team principal Christian Horner commented that Red Bull "desperately need him realising more of the potential of the car".

After the race 
Following the Hungarian Grand Prix Red Bull Racing announced that Pierre Gasly would be replaced by Alexander Albon for the remainder of the season, with Gasly taking Albon's seat at Toro Rosso.

Race classification 

Notes
  – Includes one point for fastest lap.

Championship standings after the race 

Drivers' Championship standings

Constructors' Championship standings

Note
Only the top five positions for each set of standings are shown

See also 
 2019 Budapest Formula 2 round
 2019 Budapest Formula 3 round

References

External links

Hungarian
Hungarian Grand Prix
Hungarian Grand Prix
Hungarian Grand Prix